Bree Williamson Roberts (born December 28, 1979) is a Canadian actress.

Career
After graduating from Bayview Glen School, she completed her education at the University of Toronto. She played the role of Jessica Buchanan on the ABC soap opera One Life to Live from February 5, 2003 until the series cancelation in 2012. The character is the daughter of original character Viki Lord Buchanan (played by Daytime Emmy Award-winner Erika Slezak since 1971), and gave Williamson the opportunity to portray Jessica's alternate personalities "Tess", from 2005 to 2006 and again starting in 2008 and 2011.

Williamson had previously auditioned for the role of Jen Rappaport on One Life to Live, but was rejected because of her resemblance to actress Erin Torpey the two looked nearly identical), who was playing Jessica Buchanan on the show at the time. When Torpey resigned in January 2003, Williamson was remembered by the casting department and offered the role of Jessica. She looked almost like Erin Torpey and many viewers did not notice the change.

In 2009, 2010 and 2011 Williamson was nominated for a Daytime Emmy Award for Outstanding Supporting Actress for the role of Jessica. In 2009, Williamson appeared as Brandeis on Gossip Girl in the episode "The Grandfather: Part II"; she reprised the role in the 2010 episode "The Empire Strikes Jack". In 2012, Williamson joined the cast of Haven as Dr. Claire Callahan for Season 3, which began airing in September 2012. In 2013, Williamson appeared in flashbacks as Vivian Banks, the murder victim in the NBC TV series Deception.

In 2015, Williamson appeared as April Littleton, a photographer going back to her hometown, in Portrait of Love, which premiered on Hallmark Channel on March 7. On May 26, 2016, it was announced that Williamson would originate the role of Claudette Beaulieu on July 5, 2016, on General Hospital.

Personal life
On December 29, 2005 Williamson married Josh Evans. In the July 3, 2007 edition of Soap Opera Digest, she announced that she and Evans had separated in June 2007; they later divorced. In the September 2006 issue of ABC Soaps in Depth, Williamson revealed she had just received her green card and proudly proclaimed, "Now you can't kick me out!"

In 2006 Williamson was a co-host for the Planned Parenthood Awards, which honor individuals and organizations for "their contributions to protecting women's rights." She also appeared in a public service announcement for breast cancer awareness. In 2008, Williamson married Michael Roberts. On September 21, 2010, Williamson and Roberts welcomed their first child, McGreggor Edward Roberts.

Filmography

Awards and nominations

References

External links
Bree Williamson profile - SoapOperaDigest.com
Bree Williamson Interview
Bree Williamson profile - SoapCentral.com

1979 births
21st-century Canadian actresses
Actresses from Toronto
American soap opera actresses
Canadian emigrants to the United States
Canadian soap opera actresses
Living people
University of Toronto alumni
21st-century American women